was the final daimyo of Tateyama Domain during Bakumatsu period Japan.

Biography
Inaba Masayoshi was the younger son of Ōoka Tadayuki, the daimyō of Iwatsuki Domain, Musashi Province. He was adopted into the Inaba clan as heir to Inaba Masami, the 4th Inaba daimyō of Tateyama Domain. On his Inaba Masami's retirement from public life in 1864, he succeeded to the head of the Tateyama Inaba clan and the position of daimyō of Tateyama. His immediate task was to reconcile the Domain with the new Meiji government.  In 1869, he was confirmed as Domain governor, and upon the abolition of the han system in 1871, governor of the short-lived Tateyama Prefecture. He was subsequently made a viscount (shishaku) under the kazoku peerage system.

Inaba Masayoshi had no heir, adopted and the fourth son of Inaba Hisamichi, the last daimyō of Usuki Domain in Bungo Province to carry on the Inaba name.

References
 Papinot, Edmond. (1906) Dictionnaire d'histoire et de géographie du japon. Tokyo: Librarie Sansaisha...Click link for digitized 1906 Nobiliaire du japon (2003)
 The content of much of this article was derived from that of the corresponding article on Japanese Wikipedia.

1848 births
1902 deaths
Fudai daimyo
Masayoshi
Kazoku